The 2007–08 Euro Hockey League was the inaugural season of the Euro Hockey League, Europe's premier club field hockey tournament organized by the EHF.

The final was played between UHC Hamburg and HGC at the Hazelaarweg Stadion in Rotterdam, Netherlands. UHC Hamburg defeated HGC after extra time by 1–0 to win the first edition of the Euro Hockey League.

Teams

Round one
Pools A, D, G and H were played in Wassenaar, Netherlands between 26 and 28 October 2007 and the other four pools were played in Antwerp, Belgium between 2 and 4 November 2007. If a game was won, the winning team received 5 points. A draw resulted in both teams receiving 2 points. A loss gave the losing team 1 point unless the losing team lost by 3 or more goals, then they received 0 points.

Pool A

Pool B

Pool C

Pool D

Pool E

Pool F

Pool G

Pool H

Knockout stage
The Round of 16 and the quarter-finals were played in Terrassa, Spain between 21 and 24 March 2008 and the semi-finals, third place match and the final were played in Rotterdam, Netherlands between 10 and 11 May 2008.

Round of 16

Quarter-finals

Semi-finals

Third place play-off

Final

External links
Official website

Euro Hockey League
2007–08 in European field hockey
October 2007 sports events in Europe
March 2008 sports events in Europe
May 2008 sports events in Europe
November 2007 sports events in Europe